Robert Watson (28 February 1923 – 14 December 2004) was an American artist born in Martinez, California.  Watson provided the cover art for Ray Bradbury's The Martian Chronicles, second edition, printed in 1953.

On May 17, 1997, Watson had a 50-year retrospective show at the Weinstein Gallery in San Francisco, California.  Mayor Willie Brown proclaimed that day "Robert Watson Day".

Watson died at the age of 81 in Poway, California after a brief struggle with cancer.

External links
Selected works on ArtBrokerage.com

1923 births
2004 deaths
20th-century American painters
American male painters
People from Martinez, California
Artists from California
20th-century American male artists